Andrés Bello Catholic University also known in Spanish as Universidad Católica Andrés Bello is a private university in Venezuela. One of the largest universities in Venezuela, UCAB has campuses in several cities, such as Caracas (where the main campus is located), Los Teques, Guayana, and Coro.

Named for Venezuelan writer Andrés Bello, UCAB was founded in October 1953 by the Society of Jesus (Episcopado Venezolano a la Compañía de Jesús). In 2017 it was ranked as the fourth best and top private university in Venezuela.

Programs 
Academic departments of the school include that of Economics and Social Sciences, Humanities and Education, Engineering, Theology, and the Law School. All faculties also offer postgraduate education. The university publications deal mainly with human rights issues and cultural topics. In 2013 the university opened its new library with the goal of delivering state-of-the-art services to faculty and students, including its Cultural Center and Resources for Learning and Research. The university also offers on-line courses and distance learning.

In 2016, UCAB law students took first place in the Spanish version of the International Criminal Court Moot Competition at The Hague. The university's Model United Nations team has been active since 1996, and has won the best delegation award at Harvard University.

Notable alumni

Among its notable graduates are: José Antonio Abreu (orchestra conductor, economist, political activist), Milos Alcalay (Venezuelan diplomat), Nery Santos Gómez (author), Édgar Ramírez (journalist and actor), María Corina Machado, (engineer, Assembly member, founder of Súmate), Valentina Quintero (author, journalist and tv host) and Henrique Capriles (lawyer and governor).

See also

 Education in Venezuela
 List of Jesuit sites
 List of universities in Venezuela

References

External links
YouTube site

Universidad Catolica Andres Bello
Jesuit universities and colleges
Educational institutions established in 1953
1953 establishments in Venezuela
Los Teques
Catholic schools in Venezuela